Modesto Díaz (1826–1892) was a Dominican Major General of the Cuban Liberation Army. He was a member of the Spanish Army in his country of origin during the Dominican Restoration War (1863–1865). He settled in Cuba and was reinstated to active service after the Carlos Manuel de Céspedes uprising. At the suggestion of Luis Marcano, he went to the side of the Cubans, and conducted several victorious battles against the Spanish during the Ten Years' War (1868–1878).

References

People of the Ten Years' War
Dominican Republic military personnel
People from Baní